Subira is a 2018 Kenyan drama film directed by Ravneet Sippy Chadha. It was selected as the Kenyan entry for the Best International Feature Film at the 92nd Academy Awards, but it was not nominated.

Cast
 Brenda Wairimu as Subira

See also
 List of submissions to the 92nd Academy Awards for Best International Feature Film
 List of Kenyan submissions for the Academy Award for Best International Feature Film

References

External links
 

2018 films
2018 drama films
Swahili-language films
Kenyan drama films
Films scored by Nami Melumad